Tremaine or Tremain is a small village and a rural civil parish in east Cornwall, England, United Kingdom. It is in the Registration District of Launceston and the population  in the 2001 census was 87. It had decreased to 53 at the 2011 census. There is also a diary farm called Ash Grove farm.

The parish is bounded to the north by Warbstow and Jacobstow parishes, to the east by North Petherwin parish, and to the west by Tresmeer and Treneglos parishes.

Tremaine village is 10 miles (16 km) north-west of the town of Launceston near the River Ottery. 

It is a Norman building but some of the windows are later insertions. It is a rare survival in Cornwall of a church consisting only of nave and chancel. The tower is at the west end. The font is Norman and similar to the font of Egloskerry. St Winwaloe is one of the smallest parish churches in Cornwall measuring just 12 feet wide and 44 feet long. It is named after St Winwaloe who was born of Cornish parents in 457AD. The stone building was built in the 11 century by the Bottereaux family and the church's tower was added in the 14 century.

See also

3806 Tremaine, an asteroid

References

External links

Civil parishes in Cornwall
Villages in Cornwall